Sapar Batyrov (born November 29, 1967, Turkmenistan) is a chess grandmaster (GM) from Turkmenistan. He received the grandmaster title in 1998.

Notable Tournaments

References 

1967 births
Living people
Chess grandmasters
Turkmenistan chess players